Ribeira Seca may refer to:

Azores, Portugal
 Ribeira Seca (Calheta), a civil parish in the municipality of Calheta, São Jorge
 Ribeira Seca (Ribeira Grande), a civil parish in the municipality of Ribeira Grande, São Miguel 
 Ribeira Seca (Vila Franca do Campo), a civil parish in the municipality of Vila Franca do Campo, São Miguel

Cape Verde
 Ribeira Seca (Santiago), a stream on the island of Santiago